Gideon Adinoy Sani (born 8 June 1990 in Lagos, Nigeria) is a Nigerian football player who plays for Akhisar Belediyespor.

Style
Sani is a fast and aggressive attacker with excellent scoring and dribbling ability. He is also effective as an attacking midfielder, he is technically sound and average a 95% complete passes in a game.

Career
Sani moved from the Nigerian Magate FC football academy to Turkey. He joined Turkish amateur club Izmirspor where he played 3 matches and scored 3 goals. In 2011, he signed a professional contract with Akhisar Belediyespor, professional Turkish football club and was assigned the jersey number 8.

References

External links

1990 births
Living people
Nigerian footballers
Nigerian expatriate footballers
Akhisarspor footballers
Expatriate footballers in Turkey
Nigerian expatriate sportspeople in Turkey
İzmirspor footballers
Süper Lig players
Association football forwards